Sitting in Limbo is a 2020 feature-length factual television drama about the Windrush scandal. The story focuses on the real-life experiences of a Jamaican-born British man, Anthony Bryan, one of the victims of the UK Home Office hostile environment policy on immigration. Bryan had lived in the UK for 50 years when his life was upended as a result of the Home Office mistakenly classifying him as an illegal immigrant.

Sitting in Limbo was written by Bryan's half-brother, novelist Stephen S. Thompson, and stars Patrick Robinson, Nadine Marshall, Pippa Bennett-Warner, Jay Simpson and Sarah Woodward. The film was broadcast on 8 June 2020 on BBC One.

Jimmy Cliff's song "Sitting in Limbo", from his 1971 album Another Cycle, played over the closing credits.

The programme won the British Academy Television Award for Best Single Drama at the 2021 British Academy Television Awards.

References

External links
Sitting in Limbo and Sitting in Limbo Pre-Watershed Version at BBC iPlayer
'They don't tell you why': threatened with removal after 52 years in the UK, article in The Guardian by Amelia Gentleman

2020 television films
2020 drama films
Windrush
Racism in the United Kingdom
British television films
Films set in London
Films shot in London
British films based on actual events
2020 films